Sorcery is the debut album by Kataklysm released in 1995 by Nuclear Blast. It was later re-issued with The Mystical Gate of Reincarnation as bonus tracks.

Track listing

Personnel
Kataklysm
 Sylvain Houde – vocals
 Jean-François Dagenais – guitar
 Maurizio Iacono – bass
 Max Duhamel – drums

Production
 Glen Robinson - Producer, Mixing
 Don Hackey - Engineering
 Sv Bell – Cover artwork
 Terry Petrilli – Photography

1995 debut albums
Kataklysm albums